"Fuyu no Amaoto / Night Parade" is FLOW's thirteenth single. "Night Parade" is a collaboration between FLOW and Home Made Kazoku. The single has two editions: regular and limited. The limited edition includes a bonus DVD. It reached #19 on the Oricon charts in its first week and charted for 4 weeks. *

Track listing

Bonus DVD Track listing

References

2007 singles
Ki/oon Music singles
Flow (band) songs
2007 songs
Song articles with missing songwriters